Wauseon High School is a public high school in Wauseon, Ohio.  It is the only high school in the Wauseon Exempted Village School District. The principal of Wauseon High School is Keith Leatherman and the assistant principal is Ryan O'Dell.

Academics
Wauseon High School received the "Excellent" rating, from the Ohio Department of Education, for eleven years in a row from the 2003–2004 school year to the 2014–2015 school year, when the ODE ceased the grading format. This included receiving the "Excellent with Distinction" honor for seven years.

Athletics
Athletic teams of Wauseon Schools are known as the "Indians", with their colors being red, white, and black. Wauseon is a charter member of the Northwest Ohio Athletic League, having competed in the NWOAL since 1926.

State championships
 Football: 1993
 Baseball: 1995
 Girls basketball: 1997

State runners-up
 Boys basketball: 1994
 Wrestling: 2016

Notable alumni
 Elliott Mealer; professional football player in the National Football League (NFL)
 Rick Volk; professional football player in the NFL
 Marjorie M. Whiteman; International law expert and member of the Ohio Women’s Hall of Fame

References

External links
 

High schools in Fulton County, Ohio
Public high schools in Ohio